Stigmatella is an extinct genus of bryozoans in the family Heterotrypidae. It is known from the Ordovician period and found in the U.S. states of Ohio, Kentucky and Indiana. Its colonies can form branches, lobes, or masses made from new layers encrusting upon older ones. In Kentucky, fossil remains of species Stigmatella personata that lived in underwater caves have been found, growing 'upside-down' on the cave ceiling.

See also 
 List of prehistoric bryozoans

References

External links 

 Stigmatella on strata.uga.edu

Stenolaemata genera
Prehistoric bryozoan genera
Trepostomata
Fossil taxa described in 1904
Paleozoic life of Ontario
Extinct bryozoans